The Earnscleugh or Fraser River is a river of the Otago Region of New Zealand. It arises in the Old Man Range and flows north-east to the Fraser Dam, then south-east to the Clutha River about 4 km (2.5 miles) west of Alexandra. The name Earnscleugh is given to the upper reaches of the river. The lower reaches are called the Fraser River, after one of the owners of Earnscleugh Station, William Fraser, who introduced rabbits to the area.

See also
List of rivers of New Zealand

References

Land Information New Zealand - Search for Place Names

Rivers of Otago
Rivers of New Zealand